Berkmann is a surname. Notable people with this surname include:

 Dieter Berkmann (born 1950), German cyclist
 Justin Berkmann (born 1963), English DJ and nightclub owner
 Marcus Berkmann (born 1960), English journalist and author

See also
 Bergmann
 Berkman
 Bergman